Hayes Alvis (May 1, 1907 – December 29, 1972) was an American jazz bassist and tuba player.

Career

Alvis began on drums but switched to tuba and bass after playing with Jelly Roll Morton in 1927–1928. He played tuba with Earl Hines from 1928 to 1930, and created arrangements for Hines as well.

He moved to New York City in 1931 and played with Jimmie Noone in the Mills Blue Rhythm Band from 1931 to 1934 and 1936. An early double-bass solo can be heard on the latter group's "Rhythm Spasm" (1932). Alvis also occasionally played baritone saxophone in this ensemble as well, and was the group's tour manager. From 1935 to 1938, he played with Duke Ellington, working with fellow bassist/tuba player Billy Taylor.

After his period with Ellington, Alvis played with Benny Carter, Joe Sullivan, and Louis Armstrong (in whose ensemble he replaced Pops Foster). From 1942 to 1945, Alvis played in an U.S. Army band led by Sy Oliver. After the war, Alvis played with Dave Martin until 1947, and then took a longstanding run as a house musician at the Café Society nightclub in New York City.

In the 1950s, he played in various swing and Dixieland revival groups, including Wilbur De Paris's. In the early 1970s, he played with Jay McShann and Tiny Grimes in a trio.

Death
Hayes Alvis died at his home on December 29, 1972. He was 65 years old.

References

1907 births
1972 deaths
American jazz double-bassists
Male double-bassists
American jazz tubists
American male jazz musicians
Duke Ellington Orchestra members
Musicians from Chicago
20th-century American musicians
Jazz musicians from Illinois
20th-century double-bassists
Mills Blue Rhythm Band members
20th-century American male musicians